Kings County (2016 population 68,941) is located in southern New Brunswick, Canada. Its historical shire town is Hampton.

Both the Saint John and Kennebecasis rivers pass through the county.

Approximately half of the Kings County population lives in suburbs of the nearby city of Saint John.

Census subdivisions

Communities
There are seven municipalities within Kings County (listed by 2016 population):

Parishes
The county is subdivided into fifteen parishes (listed by 2016 population):

Demographics

Population trend

Mother tongue (2016)

Protected areas and attractions

Notable people
Although not everyone in this list was born in Kings County, they all live or have lived in Kings County and have had significant connections to the communities.

See also
 List of communities in New Brunswick
 Royal eponyms in Canada

References

External links
 Kings County Guide

 
Counties of New Brunswick